Interval Research Corporation was founded in 1992 by Paul Allen and David Liddle. It was a Palo Alto laboratory and technology incubator focusing on consumer product applications and services with a focus on the Internet.

A 1997 version of the company's web page described itself as "a research setting seeking to define the issues, map out the concepts and create the technology that will be important in the future.... [pursuing] basic innovations in a number of early-stage technologies and [seeking] to foster industries around them – sparking opportunity for entrepreneurs and highlighting a new approach to research.".

A 1999 Wired magazine article based on a memo from Paul Allen described the company as under fire from Allen to produce "less R and more D." Interval Research Corporation officially closed its doors in April 2000, while a small group of former employees were kept on to form Interval Media to continue a few specific projects. Interval Media was closed in June, 2006.

Former employees

During its brief existence, Interval employed many well-known computer technology pioneers and experts, including:

 Denise Caruso, technology journalist
 Franklin C. Crow, inventor of important anti-aliasing techniques
 Sally Cruikshank, filmmaker and animator
 Marc Davis, founder of Yahoo! Research Berkeley
 Trevor Darrell, faculty at University of California, Berkeley and co-inventor of Caffe
 Paul Debevec, computer graphics researcher
 Bruce Donald, geometer and animation researcher (computer graphics), co-inventor (with Tom Ngo) of Embedded Constraint Graphics
 Caterina Fake, co-founder of Flickr and Hunch
 Rolf Faste, Stanford design professor, who led the team that named the corporation "Interval Research"
 Lee Felsenstein, designer of the first mass-produced portable computer
 Paul Freiberger, Silicon Valley journalist
 Russell Ginns, game designer and author
 Don Hopkins, new-media artist, The Sims developer and pie menu interface designer
Dan Ingalls, inventor of BitBLT and architect of several Smalltalk implementations 
 Brenda Laurel, author, entrepreneur, virtual-reality artist
 Golan Levin, new-media artist
 Daniel Levitin, cognitive neuroscientist, best-selling author
 David Liddle, venture capitalist
 Max Mathews, acoustician, computer music pioneer
 Michael Naimark, new-media artist
 John R. Pierce, electrical engineer, inventor of satellite telecommunication and the traveling wave tube
 David P. Reed, inventor of TCP/IP
 Dean Radin, a parapsychologist
 Robert Shaw, physicist and chaos theory pioneer
 Malcolm Slaney, research scientist at Google, IEEE Fellow
 Gillian Crampton Smith, founder of the Computer-Related Design program at the Royal College of Art in London, and the Interaction Design Institute Ivrea in Ivrea, Italy. 
 Scott Snibbe, new-media artist
 Russell Targ, a physicist and parapsychologist
 Bill Verplank, interface designer of the Xerox Star, the first WIMP (computing) GUI
 Leo Villareal, installation artist and Burning Man board member
 Terry Winograd, emeritus professor of computer science at Stanford University

References

External links
Think Tanked Wired magazine, December 1999

Companies based in Palo Alto, California
Technology companies established in 1992
Technology companies disestablished in 2000
Defunct companies based in California
Business incubators of the United States
Legal disputes
Patent monetization companies of the United States